"Every Storm (Runs Out of Rain)" is a song co-written recorded by American country music artist Gary Allan.  It was released in September 2012 as the first single from his album Set You Free. Allan wrote the song with Hillary Lindsey and Matt Warren.

Content
This song is a mid-tempo mainly accompanied by electric guitar. In it, the narrator expresses hope on situations improving, saying that "every storm runs, runs out of rain". The song set is in the key of A minor with a main chord pattern of Am-F-C-G. Co-writer Hillary Lindsey sings backing vocals.

Critical reception
Billy Dukes of Taste of Country gave the song four stars out of five, writing that "it’s his unique style and ability to mix gravel with rose petals that makes him such a treasured original." Matt Bjorke of Roughstock gave the song a favorable review, saying that "the California native brings oodles of charisma to a melodic heartbreak of a story that uses a storm as a metaphor for the life of a relationship."

Music video
The music video was directed by Stephen Shepherd and premiered in December 2012.

Chart performance
"Every Storm (Runs Out of Rain)" debuted at number 55 on the U.S. Billboard Hot Country Songs chart for the week of September 15, 2012. It also debuted at number 78 on the U.S. Billboard Hot 100 chart for the week of October 20, 2012. It also debuted at number 93 on the Canadian Hot 100 chart for the week of October 20, 2012. The song has since become Allan's first top 10 country hit since "Watching Airplanes" reached number 2 in early 2008. It became his fourth number-one single on both the Country Songs and Country Airplay charts, both dated February 9, 2013, and his first since "Nothing On but the Radio" in December 2004.  The song has sold over a million copies in the US as of March 2013.

Charts and certifications

Weekly charts

Year-end charts

Certifications

References

2012 singles
2012 songs
Country ballads
2010s ballads
Gary Allan songs
Songs written by Hillary Lindsey
MCA Nashville Records singles
Songs written by Gary Allan
Song recordings produced by Greg Droman
Songs containing the I–V-vi-IV progression
MCA Records singles